The Journal of Theoretical Biology is a biweekly peer-reviewed scientific journal covering theoretical biology, as well as mathematical, computational, and statistical aspects of biology. Some research areas covered by the journal include cell biology, evolutionary biology, population genetics, morphogenesis, and immunology.

The journal was established in 1961. Its founding editor-in-chief was English biologist James F. Danielli, who remained editor until his death in 1984. The journal is published by Elsevier and, the editors-in-chief are Denise Kirschner (University of Michigan Medical School), Mark Chaplain (University of St. Andrews), and Akira Sawaki (Aichi Cancer Center, Nagoya). Lewis Wolpert served as editor-in-chief for more than 55 years.

According to the Journal Citation Reports the journal has a 2020 impact factor of 2.691.

Notable articles 
The following are the most highly cited articles (more than 2000 citations at April 2021) that have been published in the journal:

 A classic paper dealing with inclusive fitness.

 Presentation of the handicap principle.

 Information content of collections of biological species.

 Forerunner of Kauffman's autocatalytic sets.

 An antithesis to the view that gregarious behaviour is evolved through benefits to the population or species.

 The French flag model of embryogenesis.

References

External links
 

Mathematical and theoretical biology journals
Elsevier academic journals
Publications established in 1961
Biweekly journals
English-language journals